Ismaila Ousman (born 16 June 1997) is a Cameroonian professional footballer who plays for Diósgyőri VTK.

Club statistics

Updated to games played as of 9 March 2019.

References

External links

1997 births
Living people
People from Yaoundé
Cameroonian footballers
Association football midfielders
Diósgyőri VTK players
Nemzeti Bajnokság I players
Cameroonian expatriate footballers
Expatriate footballers in Hungary
Cameroonian expatriate sportspeople in Hungary